A list of notable chemists from Slovenia:

D 
 Davorin Dolar (1921–2005)

G 
 Franc Gubenšek

K 
 Ana Kansky (1895–1962)
 Drago Kolar (1932–2000)

P 
 Friderik Pregl (1869–1930)

S 
 Branko Stanovnik (1932-)

Š  
 Ana Štěrba-Böhm (1885–1936)

 
Chemist